Grisly is a word meaning horrifiying, repellent or gruesome.  It may refer to:

Grisly Steevens, nickname of Griselda Steevens (1653–1746), Irish philanthropist
The Grisly Folk, short story by H G Wells
The Grisly Wife, novel by Rodney Hall

See also 
Grizzly (disambiguation)